Egon Naganowski (31 March 1913, Innsbruck, Austria — 23 January 2000, Poznan, Poland) is a Polish literary critic, essayist and literary translator (mostly from German).

He was married , also translator, who co-worked with him.

Books
 Magiczny klucz: opowieść o życiu i twórczości młodego Martina Nexø (1958)
 Telemach w labiryncie świata: o twórczości Jamesa Joyce’a (1962)
 Podróż bez końca: opowieść o życiu i twórczości Roberta Musila (1980)
 Robert Musil (1980)
 Poznań'56 (1981, collection of essays)
 Młodzieńczy eros i inne wspomnienia z dawnych lat (1992, memoirs)

Awards

1988: Karl Dedecius Prize For Polish translators from German, Germany 
1990:  Officer's Cross of the Order of Polonia Restituta
1993: Artistic Award of the City of Poznan
1987 Austrian Cross of Honour for Science and Art, First Class

References

1913 births
2000 deaths
Writers from Innsbruck
People from the County of Tyrol
Polish translators
Polish literary critics
20th-century translators